Collegium Humanum – Warsaw Management University – an international, private university with its seat in Warsaw and branches in Rzeszów, Poznań, the Czech Republic (Prague, Frydek-Mistek), Slovakia (Bratislava) and Uzbekistan (Andijan).

History 

The university was established in 2018 by the decision of the Minister of Science and Higher Education at the request of the Institute of International Studies and Education Humanum Sp. z o.o. with its seat in Warsaw and was then entered into the Register of Private Universities of the Ministry of Science and Higher Education under the number of 383.

Collegium Humanum is a member of the Business Graduates Association.

In 2020, Collegium Humanum received the “Pro Masovia” Commemorative Medal for its particular contribution to the economic, social and cultural development of the wider Mazovia Region.

Since 2020, Collegium Humanum has been a signatory to PRME (the Principles for Responsible Management Education), an international forum of leading business universities from around the world operating under the auspices of the United Nations, whose aims are to shape global attitudes of social responsibility among future leaders across business, politics and other dimensions of public life.

Postgraduate studies of Executive Master of Business Administration (MBA) taught at Collegium Humanum have secured a Professional Class ranking in the MBA Programme Rating prepared by the MBA SEM Forum 2020.

Since 2020, Collegium Humanum has been also a member of CEEMAN, the International Association for Management Development in Dynamic Societies.

Bachelor’s and Master’s degree programmes

Headquarters in Warsaw 

 first-cycle studies (Bachelor's) in Management
 first-cycle studies (Bachelor's) in Finance and Accounting
 second-cycle studies (Master's) in Management
 second-cycle studies (Master's) in Finance and Accounting
 uniform Master's studies in Psychology
 uniform Master's studies in Law
 uniform Master's studies in Preschool and Early School Education

Branch in Poznań 

 first-cycle studies (Bachelor's) in Management
 second-cycle studies (Master's) in Management
 uniform Master's studies in Psychology

Branch in Rzeszów 

 uniform Master's studies in Psychology
 first-cycle studies (Bachelor's) in Pedagogy
 second-cycle studies (Master's) in Pedagogy

Branch in Prague (the Czech Republic) 

 first-cycle studies (Bachelor's) in Management
 second-cycle studies (Master's) in Management

Branch in Frydek-Mistek (the Czech Republic) 

 first-cycle studies (Bachelor's) in Pedagogy
 second-cycle studies (Master's) in Pedagogy
 first-cycle studies (Bachelor's) in Social Work
 second-cycle studies (Master's) in Social Work

Branch in Bratislava (Slovakia) 

 first-cycle studies (Bachelor's) in Management
 second-cycle studies (Master's) in Management

Branch in Andijan (Uzbekistan) 

 first-cycle studies (Bachelor's) in Management
 second-cycle studies (Master's) in Management

Postgraduate studies 

 Executive Master of Business Administration (MBA)
 Executive Master of Business Administration (MBA) - Healthcare Management
 Executive Master of Business Administration (MBA) - IT Management
 Executive Master of Business Administration (MBA) - Tourism Management
 Executive Master of Business Administration (MBA) - Agribusiness Management 
 Executive Master of Business Administration (MBA) - Security Management
 Master of Laws (LL.M.) - Law in Business
 Doctor of Business Administration (DBA)
 Internet Marketing (e-Marketing and e-Commerce)
 Psychotraumatology
 Control and Audit
 HR, Finance and Payroll
 Health Educator
 Monitoring of Clinical Trials
 Personal Data Protection Inspector (DPO)

Publishing 

The university publishes the following scientific journals:
 International Social and Humanities Studies - Humanum , 7 points on the ranking list of journals awarded by the Ministry of Science and Higher Education (List B No. 992),
 European Social and Humanities Studies - Prosopon , 6 points on the ranking list of journals awarded by the Ministry of Science and Higher Education (List B No. 1356),
 International Humanities Studies - Society and Education , 7 points on the ranking list of journals awarded by the Ministry of Science and Higher Education (List B No. 1667),
 Language and Communication , 5 points on the ranking list of journals awarded by the Ministry of Science and Higher Education (List B No. 1000).

Honorary professors of Collegium Humanum 

 prof. Václav Klaus, dr. h.c. 
 prof. Andrzej Kraśnicki, dr h.c.

See also 
 List of universities in Poland
 List of universities in the Czech Republic

References 

International schools in Uzbekistan
Schools in Bratislava
Universities and colleges in Poznań
Universities and colleges in Rzeszów
Universities and colleges in Warsaw
Universities in the Czech Republic